"Auf der Jagd" ("On the Hunt"), op. 373, is a polka composed by Johann Strauss II. The composition is based on melodies in Strauss' operetta Cagliostro in Wien (Cagliostro in Vienna).

It was first performed in the late autumn of 1875, probably with the composer's brother Eduard conducting the Strauss Orchestra. Professor Fritz Racek has suggested that the première took place in the Vienna Volksgarten on 5 October 1875, although this claim remains unsubstantiated.

A pistol shot is specified in the piano and orchestral score.

References

Compositions by Johann Strauss II
Polkas.
1875 compositions